Atatürk Havalimanı is the western terminal station on the M1A line of the Istanbul Metro. The station services Atatürk International Airport in Istanbul, which was the primary international gateway in Turkey. Atatürk Havalimanı was opened on 20 December 2002, along with DTM—İstanbul Fuar Merkezi, when the M1A (then just M1) was extended west of Yenibosna to the airport. The station is located next to the international terminal and is linked to the domestic terminal via a walkway.

As a result of the closing of Atatürk International Airport for commercial passenger traffic and its replacement by a new airport northwest of the city in April 2019, the station no longer receives passenger traffic. It will continue to serve the airport in its remaining functions, including business flights, cargo, and general aviation; and the area surrounding the airport. The M11, which will connect the new airport to the rest of the metro system, its first section opened on 22 January 2023.

Layout

References

Railway stations opened in 2002
2002 establishments in Turkey
Istanbul metro stations
Bakırköy
Airport railway stations in Turkey
Metro Istanbul